Stjepan Oštrek (born 9 August 1996) is a Croatian professional footballer who plays for Nafta 1903.

Career statistics

References

External links
Profile at Magyarfutball.hu
Profile at HNS

1996 births
Living people
Sportspeople from Varaždin
Association football midfielders
Croatian footballers
Croatia youth international footballers
NK Nafta Lendava players
Zalaegerszegi TE players
FC Koper players
Slovenian Second League players
Nemzeti Bajnokság I players
Slovenian PrvaLiga players
Croatian expatriate footballers
Expatriate footballers in Italy
Expatriate footballers in Slovenia
Expatriate footballers in Hungary
Croatian expatriate sportspeople in Italy
Croatian expatriate sportspeople in Slovenia
Croatian expatriate sportspeople in Hungary